Bauria is a Bhil language of India.

Bauria, Wagdi, and Vaghri are variants of the same name. It's not clear how many languages they are.

References

Languages of India
Bhil